Domingo Faustino Sarmiento (born Domingo Faustino Fidel Valentín Sarmiento y Albarracín; 15 February 1811 – 11 September 1888) was an Argentine activist, intellectual, writer, statesman and the second President of Argentina. His writing spanned a wide range of genres and topics, from journalism to autobiography, to political philosophy and history.  He was a member of a group of intellectuals, known as the Generation of 1837, who had a great influence on 19th-century Argentina. He was particularly concerned with educational issues and was also an important influence on the region's literature.

Sarmiento grew up in a poor but politically active family that paved the way for many of his future accomplishments. Between 1843 and 1850, he was frequently in exile, and wrote in both Chile and in Argentina. His greatest literary achievement was Facundo, a critique of Juan Manuel de Rosas, that Sarmiento wrote while working for the newspaper El Progreso during his exile in Chile. The book brought him far more than just literary recognition; he expended his efforts and energy on the war against dictatorships, specifically that of Rosas, and contrasted enlightened Europe—a world where, in his eyes, democracy, social services, and intelligent thought were valued—with the barbarism of the gaucho and especially the caudillo, the ruthless strongmen of nineteenth-century Argentina.

While president of Argentina from 1868 to 1874, Sarmiento championed intelligent thought—including education for children and women—and democracy for Latin America. He also took advantage of the opportunity to modernize and develop train systems, a postal system, and a comprehensive education system. He spent many years in ministerial roles on the federal and state levels where he travelled abroad and examined other education systems.

Sarmiento died in Asunción, Paraguay, at the age of 77 from a heart attack. He was buried in Buenos Aires. Today, he is respected as a political innovator and writer. Miguel de Unamuno considered him among the greatest writers of Castilian prose.

Youth and influences 

Sarmiento was born in Carrascal, a poor suburb of San Juan, Argentina on 15 February 1811. His father, José Clemente Quiroga Sarmiento y Funes, had served in the military during the wars of independence, returning prisoners of war to San Juan. His mother, Doña Paula Zoila de Albarracín e Irrázabal, was a very pious woman, who lost her father at a young age and was left with very little to support herself. As a result, she took to selling her weaving in order to afford to build a house of her own. On 21 September 1801, José and Paula were married. They had 15 children, 9 of whom died; Domingo was the only son to survive to adulthood. Sarmiento was greatly influenced by his parents, his mother who was always working hard, and his father who told stories of being a patriot and serving his country, something Sarmiento strongly believed in. In Sarmiento's own words:

At the age of four, Sarmiento was taught to read by his father and his uncle, José Eufrasio Quiroga Sarmiento, who later became Bishop of Cuyo. Another uncle who influenced him in his youth was Domingo de Oro, a notable figure in the young Argentine Republic who was influential in bringing Juan Manuel de Rosas to power. Though Sarmiento did not follow de Oro's political and religious leanings, he learned the value of intellectual integrity and honesty. He developed scholarly and oratorical skills, qualities which de Oro was famous for.
In 1816, at the age of five, Sarmiento began attending the primary school La Escuela de la Patria. He was a good student, and earned the title of First Citizen (Primer Ciudadano) of the school. After completing primary school, his mother wanted him to go to Córdoba to become a priest. He had spent a year reading the Bible and often spent time as a child helping his uncle with church services, but Sarmiento soon became bored with religion and school, and got involved with a group of aggressive children. Sarmiento's father took him to the Loreto Seminary in 1821, but for reasons unknown, Sarmiento did not enter the seminary, returning instead to San Juan with his father. In 1823, the Minister of State, Bernardino Rivadavia, announced that the six top pupils of each state would be selected to receive higher education in Buenos Aires. Sarmiento was at the top of the list in San Juan, but it was then announced that only ten pupils would receive the scholarship. The selection was made by lot, and Sarmiento was not one of the scholars whose name was drawn.

Like many other nineteenth century Argentines prominent in public life, he was a freemason.

Political background and exiles

In 1826, an assembly elected Bernardino Rivadavia as president of the United Provinces of the Río de la Plata. This action roused the ire of the provinces, and civil war was the result. Support for a strong, centralized Argentine government was based in Buenos Aires, and gave rise to two opposing groups. The wealthy and educated of the Unitarian Party, such as Sarmiento, favored centralized government. In opposition to them were the Federalists, who were mainly based in rural areas and tended to reject European mores. Numbering figures such as Manuel Dorrego and Juan Facundo Quiroga among their ranks, they were in favor of a loose federation with more autonomy for the individual provinces.

Opinion of the Rivadavia government was divided between the two ideologies. For Unitarians like Sarmiento, Rivadavia's presidency was a positive experience. He set up a European-staffed university and supported a public education program for rural male children. He also supported theater and opera groups, publishing houses and a museum. These contributions were considered as civilizing influences by the Unitarians, but they upset the Federalist constituency. Common laborers had their salaries subjected to a government cap, and the gauchos were arrested by Rivadavia for vagrancy and forced to work on public projects, usually without pay.

In 1827, the Unitarians were challenged by Federalist forces. After the resignation of Rivadavia, Manuel Dorrego was installed as governor of Buenos Aires province. He quickly made peace with Brazil but, on returning to Argentina, was overthrown and executed by the Unitarian general Juan Lavalle, who took Dorrego's place. However, Lavalle did not spend long as governor either: he was soon overthrown by militias composed largely of gauchos led by Rosas and Estanislao López. By the end of 1829 the old legislature that Lavalle had disbanded was back in place and had appointed Rosas as governor of Buenos Aires.

The first time Sarmiento was forced to leave home was with his uncle, José de Oro, in 1827, because of his military activities. José de Oro was a priest who had fought in the Battle of Chacabuco under General San Martín. Together, Sarmiento and de Oro went to San Francisco del Monte, in the neighbour province of San Luis. He spent much of his time with his uncle learning and began to teach at the only school in town. Later that year, his mother wrote to him asking him to come home. Sarmiento refused, only to receive a response from his father that he was coming to collect him. His father had persuaded the governor of San Juan to send Sarmiento to Buenos Aires to study at the College of Moral Sciences (Colegio de Ciencias Morales).

Soon after Sarmiento's return, the province of San Juan broke out into civil war and Facundo Quiroga invaded Sarmiento's town. As historian William Katra describes this "traumatic experience":

Unable to attend school in Buenos Aires due to the political turmoil, Sarmiento chose to fight against Quiroga. He joined and fought in the unitarian army, only to be placed under house arrest when San Juan was eventually taken over by Quiroga after the battle of Pilar. He was later released, only to join the forces of General Paz, a key unitarian figure.

First exile in Chile

Fighting and war soon resumed, but, one by one, Quiroga vanquished the main allies of General Paz, including the Governor of San Juan, and in 1831 Sarmiento fled to Chile. He did not return to Argentina for five years. At the time, Chile was noted for its good public administration, its constitutional organization, and the rare freedom to criticize the regime. In Sarmiento's view, Chile had "Security of property, the continuation of order, and with both of these, the love of work and the spirit of enterprise that causes the development of wealth and prosperity."

As a form of freedom of expression, Sarmiento began to write political commentary. In addition to writing, he also began teaching in Los Andes. Due to his innovative style of teaching, he found himself in conflict with the governor of the province. He founded his own school in Pocuro as a response to the governor. During this time, Sarmiento fell in love and had an illegitimate daughter named Ana Faustina, who Sarmiento did not acknowledge until she married.

San Juan and second and third exiles in Chile

In 1836, Sarmiento returned to San Juan, seriously ill with typhoid fever; his family and friends thought he would die upon his return, but he recovered and established an anti-federalist journal called El Zonda. The government of San Juan did not like Sarmiento's criticisms and censored the magazine by imposing an unaffordable tax upon each purchase. Sarmiento was forced to cease publication of the magazine in 1840. He also founded a school for girls during this time called the Santa Rosa High School, which was a preparatory school. In addition to the school, he founded a Literary Society.

It is around this time that Sarmiento became associated with the so-called "Generation of 1837". This was a group of activists, who included Esteban Echeverría, Juan Bautista Alberdi, and Bartolomé Mitre, who spent much of the 1830s to 1880s first agitating for and then bringing about social change, advocating republicanism, free trade, freedom of speech, and material progress. Though, based in San Juan, Sarmiento was absent from the initial creation of this group, in 1838 he wrote to Alberdi seeking the latter's advice; and in time he would become the group's most fervent supporter.

In 1840, after being arrested and accused of conspiracy, Sarmiento was forced into exile in Chile again. It was en route to Chile that, in the baths of Zonda, he wrote the graffiti "On ne tue point les idées," an incident that would later serve as the preface to his book Facundo. Once on the other side of the Andes, in 1841 Samiento started writing for the Valparaíso newspaper El Mercurio, as well working as a publisher of the Crónica Contemporánea de Latino América ("Contemporary Latin American Chronicle"). In 1842, Sarmiento was appointed the Director of the first Normal School in South America; the same year he also founded the newspaper El Progreso. During this time he sent for his family from San Juan to Chile. In 1843, Sarmiento published Mi Defensa ("My Defence"), while continuing to teach. And in May 1845, El Progreso started the serial publication of the first edition of his best-known work, Facundo; in July, Facundo appeared in book form.

Between the years 1845 and 1847, Sarmiento travelled on behalf of the Chilean government across parts of South America to Uruguay, Brazil, to Europe, France, Spain, Algeria, Italy, Armenia, Switzerland, England, to Cuba, and to North America, the United States and Canada in order to examine different education systems and the levels of education and communication. Based on his travels, he wrote the book Viajes por Europa, África, y América which was published in 1849.

In 1848, Sarmiento voluntarily left to Chile once again. During the same year, he met widow Benita Martínez Pastoriza, married her, and adopted her son, Domingo Fidel, or Dominguito, who would be killed in action during the War of the Triple Alliance at Curupaytí in 1866. Sarmiento continued to exercise the idea of freedom of the press and began two new periodicals entitled La Tribuna and La Crónica respectively, which strongly attacked Juan Manuel de Rosas. During this stay in Chile, Sarmiento's essays became more strongly opposed to Juan Manuel de Rosas. The Argentine government tried to have Sarmiento extradited from Chile to Argentina, but the Chilean government refused to hand him over.

In 1850, he published both Argirópolis and Recuerdos de Provincia (Recollections of a Provincial Past). In 1852, Rosas's regime was finally brought down. Sarmiento became involved in debates about the country's new constitution.

Return to Argentina

In 1854, Sarmiento briefly visited Mendoza, just across the border from Chile in Western Argentina, but he was arrested and imprisoned. Upon his release, he went back to Chile. But in 1855 he put an end to what was now his "self-imposed" exile in Chile: he arrived in Buenos Aires, soon to become editor-in-chief of the newspaper El Nacional. He was also appointed town councillor in 1856, and 1857 he joined the provincial Senate, a position he held until 1861.

It was in 1861, shortly after Mitre became Argentine president, that Sarmiento left Buenos Aires and returned to San Juan, where he was elected governor, a post he took up in 1862. It was then that he passed the Statutory Law of Public Education, making it mandatory for children to attend primary school. It allowed for a number of institutions to be opened including secondary schools, military schools and an all-girls school. While governor, he developed roads and infrastructure, built public buildings and hospitals, encouraged agriculture and allowed for mineral mining. He resumed his post as editor of El Zonda. In 1863, Sarmiento fought against the power of the caudillo of La Rioja and found himself in conflict with the Interior Minister of General Mitre's government, Guillermo Rawson. Sarmiento stepped down as governor of San Juan to become the Plenipotentiary Minister to the United States, where he was sent in 1865, soon after the assassination of President Abraham Lincoln. Moved by the story of Lincoln, Sarmiento ended up writing his book Vida de Lincoln. It was on this trip that Sarmiento received an honorary degree from the University of Michigan. A bust of him stood in the Modern Languages Building at the University of Michigan until multiple student protests prompted its removal. Students installed plaques and painted the bust red to represent the controversies surrounding his policies towards the indigenous people in Argentina. There still stands a statue of Sarmiento at Brown University. While on this trip, he was asked to run for President again. He won, taking office on 12 October 1868.

President of Argentina, 1868–1874

Domingo Faustino Sarmiento served as President of the Republic of Argentina from 1868 to 1874, becoming president despite the maneuverings of his predecessor Bartolomé Mitre. According to biographer Allison Bunkley, his presidency "marks the advent of the middle, or land-owning classes as the pivot power of the nation. The age of the gaucho had ended, and the age of the merchant and cattleman had begun." Sarmiento sought to create basic freedoms, and wanted to ensure civil safety and progress for everyone, not just the few. Sarmiento's tour of the United States had given him many new ideas about politics, democracy, and the structure of society, especially when he was the Argentine ambassador to the country from 1865 to 1868. He found New England, specifically the Boston-Cambridge area to be the source of much of his influence, writing in an Argentine newspaper that New England was "the cradle of the modern republic, the school for all of America." He described Boston as "The pioneer city of the modern world, the Zion of the ancient Puritans ... Europe contemplates in New England the power which in the future will supplant her." Not only did Sarmiento evolve political ideas, but also structural ones by transitioning Argentina from a primarily agricultural economy to one focused on cities and industry.

Historian David Rock notes that, beyond putting an end to caudillismo, Sarmiento's main achievements in government concerned his promotion of education. As Rock reports, "between 1868 and 1874 educational subsidies from the central government to the provinces quadrupled." He established 800 educational and military institutions, and his improvements to the educational system enabled 100,000 children to attend school.

He also pushed forward modernization more generally, building infrastructure including  of telegraph line across the country for improved communications, making it easier for the government in Buenos Aires and the provinces to communicate; modernizing the postal and train systems which he believed to be integral for interregional and national economies, as well as building the Red Line, a train line that would bring goods to Buenos Aires in order to better facilitate trade with Great Britain. By the end of his presidency, the Red Line extended . In 1869, he conducted Argentina's first national census.

Though Sarmiento is well known historically, he was not a popular president. Indeed, Rock judges that "by and large his administration was a disappointment". During his presidency, Argentina conducted an unpopular war against Paraguay; at the same time, people were displeased with him for not fighting for the Straits of Magellan from Chile. Although he increased productivity, he increased expenditures, which also negatively affected his popularity. In addition, the arrival of a large influx of European immigrants was blamed for the outbreak of Yellow Fever in Buenos Aires and the risk of civil war. Moreover, Sarmiento's presidency was further marked by ongoing rivalry between Buenos Aires and the provinces. In the war against Paraguay, Sarmiento's adopted son was killed. Sarmiento suffered from immense grief and was thought to never have been the same again.

On 22 August 1873, Sarmiento was the target of an unsuccessful assassination attempt, when two Italian anarchist brothers shot at his coach. They had been hired by federal caudillo Ricardo López Jordán. A year later in 1874, he completed his term as President and stepped down, handing his presidency over to Nicolás Avellaneda, his former Minister of Education.

Final years

In 1875, following his term as President, Sarmiento became the General Director of Schools for the Province of Buenos Aires. That same year, he became the Senator for San Juan, a post that he held until 1879, when he became Interior Minister. But he soon resigned, following conflict with the Governor of Buenos Aires, Carlos Tejedor. He then assumed the post of Superintendent General of Schools for the National Education Ministry under President Roca and published El Monitor de la Educación Común, which is a fundamental reference for Argentine education. In 1882, Sarmiento was successful in passing the sanction of Free Education allowing schools to be free, mandatory, and separate from that of religion.

In May 1888, Sarmiento left Argentina for Paraguay. He was accompanied by his daughter, Ana, and his companion Aurelia Vélez. He died in Asunción on 11 September 1888, from a heart attack, and was buried in Buenos Aires, after a ten-day trip. His tomb at La Recoleta Cemetery lies under a sculpture, a condor upon a pylon, designed by himself and executed by Victor de Pol. Pedro II, the Emperor of Brazil and a great admirer of Sarmiento, sent to his funeral procession a green and gold crown of flowers with a message written in Spanish remembering the highlights of his life: "Civilization and Barbarism, Tonelero, Monte Caseros, Petrópolis, Public Education. Remembrance and Homage from Pedro de Alcântara."

Philosophy 

Sarmiento was well known for his modernization of the country, and for his improvements to the educational system. He firmly believed in democracy and European liberalism, but was most often seen as a romantic. Sarmiento was well versed in Western philosophy including the works of Karl Marx and John Stuart Mill. He was particularly fascinated with the liberty given to those living in the United States, which he witnessed as a representative of the Peruvian government. He did, however, see pitfalls to liberty, pointing for example to the aftermath of the French Revolution, which he compared to Argentina's own May Revolution. He believed that liberty could turn into anarchy and thus civil war, which is what happened in France and in Argentina. Therefore, his use of the term "liberty" was more in reference to a laissez-faire approach to the economy, and religious liberty. Though a Catholic himself, he began to adopt the ideas of separation of church and state modeled after the US. He believed that there should be more religious freedom, and less religious affiliation in schools. This was one of many ways in which Sarmiento tried to connect South America to North America.

Sarmiento believed that the material and social needs of people had to be satisfied but not at the cost of order and decorum. He put great importance on law and citizen participation. These ideas he most equated to Rome and to the United States, a society which he viewed as exhibiting similar qualities. In order to civilize the Argentine society and make it equal to that of Rome or the United States, Sarmiento believed in eliminating the caudillos, or the larger landholdings and establishing multiple agricultural colonies run by European immigrants.

Coming from a family of writers, orators, and clerics, Domingo Sarmiento placed a great value on education and learning. He opened a number of schools including the first school in Latin America for teachers in Santiago in 1842: La Escuela Normal Preceptores de Chile. He proceeded to open 18 more schools and had mostly female teachers from the USA come to Argentina to instruct graduates how to be effective when teaching. Sarmiento's belief was that education was the key to happiness and success, and that a nation could not be democratic if it was not educated. "We must educate our rulers," he said. "An ignorant people will always choose Rosas.". His views on the South American Indians have been more controversial. For example, in El Nacional (Nov. 25, 1857) Sarmiento wrote: “Will we be able to exterminate the Indians? For the savages of America, I feel an invincible repugnance that I cannot cure. Those scoundrels are not anything more than disgusting Indians that I would hang if they reappeared. Lautaro and Caupolicán are dirty Indians, because that's how they are all. Incapable of progress, their extermination is providential and useful, sublime and great. They must be exterminated without even sparing the little one, who already has the instinctive hatred for the civilized man.”

Publications

Major works

 Facundo – Civilización y Barbarie – Vida de Juan Facundo Quiroga, 1845. Written during his long exile in Chile. Originally published in 1845 in Chile in installments in El Progreso newspaper, Facundo is Sarmiento's most famous work. It was first published in book form in 1851, and the first English translation, by Mary Mann, appeared in 1868. A recent modern edition in English was translated by Kathleen Ross. Facundo promotes further civilization and European influence on Argentine culture through the use of anecdotes and references to Juan Facundo Quiroga, Argentine caudillo general. As well as being a call to progress, Sarmiento discusses the nature of Argentine peoples as well as including his thoughts and objections to Juan Manuel de Rosas, governor of Buenos Aires from 1829 to 1832 and again from 1835, due to the turmoil generated by Facundo's death, to 1852. As literary critic Sylvia Molloy observes, Sarmiento claimed that this book helped explain Argentine struggles to European readers, and was cited in European publications. Written with extensive assistance from others, Sarmiento adds to his own memory the quotes, accounts, and dossiers from other historians and companions of Facundo Quiroga. Facundo maintains its relevance in modern-day as well, bringing attention to the contrast of lifestyles in Latin America, the conflict and struggle for progress while maintaining tradition, as well as the moral and ethical treatment of the public by government officials and regimes.
 Recuerdos de Provincia (Recollections of a Provincial Past), 1850. In this second autobiography, Sarmiento displays a stronger effort to include familial links and ties to his past, in contrast to Mi defensa, choosing to relate himself to San Juan and his Argentine heritage. Sarmiento discusses growing up in rural Argentina with basic ideologies and simple livings. Recuerdos discusses his Similar to Facundo, Sarmiento uses previous dossiers filed against himself by enemies to assist in writing Recuerdos and therefore fabricating an autobiography based on these files and from his own memory. Sarmiento's persuasion in this book is substantial. The accounts, whether all true or false against him, are a source of information to write Recuerdos as he is then able to object and rectify into what he creates as a 'true account' of autobiography.

Other works

Sarmiento was a prolific author. The following is a selection of his other works:

 Mi defensa, 1843. This was Sarmiento's first autobiography in a pamphlet form, which omits any substantial information or recognition of his illegitimate daughter Ana. This would have discredited Sarmiento as a respected father of Argentina, as Sarmiento portrays himself as a sole individual, disregarding or denouncing important ties to other people and groups in his life.
 Viajes por Europa, África, y América 1849. A description and observations while travelling as a representative of the Chilean government to learn more about educational systems around the world.
 Argirópolis 1850. A description of a future utopian city in the River Plate States.
 Comentarios sobre la constitución 1852. This is Sarmiento's official account of his ideologies promoting civilization and the "Europeanization" and "Americanization" of Argentina. This account includes dossiers, articles, speeches and information regarding the pending constitution.
 Informes sobre educación, 1856. This report was the first official statistic report on education in Latin America includes information on gender and location distribution of pupils, salaries and wages, and comparative achievement. Informes sobre educación proposes new theories, plans, and methods of education as well as quality controls on schools and learning systems.
 Las Escuelas, base de la prosperidad y de la republica en los Estados Unidos 1864. This work, along with the previous two, were intended to persuade Latin America and Argentines of the benefits of the educational, economic and political systems of the United States, which Sarmiento supported.
 Conflicto y armonías de las razas en América 1883, deals with race issues in Latin America in the late 1800s. While situations in the book remain particular to the time period and location, race issues and conflicts of races are still prevalent and enable the book to be relevant in the present day.
 Vida de Dominguito, 1886. A memoir of Dominguito, Sarmiento's adopted son who was the only child Sarmiento had always accepted. Many of the notes used to compile Vida de Dominguito had been written 20 years prior during one of Sarmiento's stays in Washington.
 Educar al soberano, a compilation of letters written from 1870 to 1886 on the topic of improved education, promoting and suggesting new reforms such as secondary schools, parks, sporting fields and specialty schools. This compilation was met with far greater success than Ortografía, Instrucción Publica and received greater public support.
 El camino de Lacio, which impacted Argentina by influencing many Italians to immigrate by relating Argentinas history to that of Latium of the Roman empire.
 Inmigración y colonización, a publication which led to mass immigration of Europeans to mostly urban Argentina, which Sarmiento believed would assist in 'civilizing' the country over the more barbaric gauchos and rural provinces. This had a large impact on Argentine politics, especially as much of the civil tension in the country was divided between the rural provinces and the cities. In addition to increased urban population, these European immigrants had a cultural effect upon Argentina, providing what Sarmiento believed to be more civilized culture similar to North America's.
 On the Condition of Foreigners, which helped to assist political changes for immigrants in 1860.
 Ortografía, Instrucción Publica, an example of Sarmiento's passion for improved education. Sarmiento focused on illiteracy of the youth, and suggested simplifying reading and spelling for the public education system, a method which was never implemented.
 Práctica Constitucional, a three volume work, describing current political methods as well as propositions for new methodologies.
 Presidential Papers, a history of his presidency, formed of many personal and external documents.
 Travels in the United States in 1847, (Edited and translated into English by Michael Aaron Rockland.)

Legacy

The impact of Domingo Faustino Sarmiento is most obviously seen in the establishment of September 11 as Panamerican Teacher's Day which was done in his honor at the 1943 Interamerican Conference on Education, held in Panama. Today, he is still considered to be Latin America's teacher. In his time, he opened countless schools, created free public libraries, opened immigration, and worked towards a Union of Plate States.

His impact was not only on the world of education, but also on Argentine political and social structure. His ideas are now revered as innovative, though at the time they were not widely accepted. He was a self-made man and believed in sociological and economic growth for Latin America, something that the Argentine people could not recognize at the time with the soaring standard of living which came with high prices, high wages, and an increased national debt.

There is a building named in his honor at the Argentine embassy in Washington D.C.

Today, there is a statue in honor of Sarmiento in Boston on the Commonwealth Avenue Mall, between Gloucester and Hereford streets, erected in 1973. There is a square, Plaza Sarmiento in Rosario, Argentina. One of Rodin's last sculptures was that of Sarmiento which is now in Buenos Aires.

Notes

Footnotes

References
.

.
.
.
.
.
.
.
. Edited by Barry L. Velleman. There is a Spanish translation of these letters, "Mi estimado señor": Cartas de Mary Mann a Sarmiento (1865–1881). Buenos Aires: Icana y Victoria Ocampo, 2005. Edited by Barry L. Velleman. Translated by Marcela Solá. .

.
.
.

.
. Trans. by Elizabeth Garrels and Asa Zatz.
 The first complete English translation.

External links

 
 
 

|-

|-

|-

Domingo Faustino Sarmiento
1811 births
1888 deaths
People from San Juan Province, Argentina
Governors of San Juan Province, Argentina
Argentine people of Spanish descent
Unitarianists (Argentina)
Presidents of Argentina
Foreign ministers of Argentina
Argentine male writers
19th-century Argentine historians
Argentine educational theorists
Ambassadors of Argentina to Chile
Argentine Freemasons
Argentine prisoners of war
Shooting survivors
Burials at La Recoleta Cemetery
19th-century male writers
Argentine Catholics